In the context of the physical and mathematical theory of percolation, a percolation transition is characterized by a set of universal critical exponents, which describe the fractal properties of the percolating medium at large scales and sufficiently close to the transition. The exponents are universal in the sense that they only depend on the type of percolation model and on the space dimension. They are expected to not depend on microscopic details such as the lattice structure, or whether site or bond percolation is considered. This article deals with the critical exponents of random percolation.

Percolating systems have a parameter  which controls the occupancy of sites or bonds in the system. At a critical value , the mean cluster size goes to infinity and the percolation transition takes place. While the exponent of that power law is generally the same on both sides of the threshold, the coefficient or "amplitude" is generally different, leading to a universal amplitude ratio.

Description 
Thermodynamic or configurational systems near a critical point or a continuous phase transition become fractal, and the behavior of many quantities in such circumstances is described by universal critical exponents. Percolation theory is a particularly simple and fundamental model in statistical mechanics which has a critical point, and a great deal of work has been done in finding its critical exponents, both theoretically (limited to two dimensions) and numerically.

Critical exponents exist for a variety of observables, but most of them are linked to each other by exponent (or scaling) relations. Only a few of them are independent, and the choice of the fundamental exponents depends on the focus of the study at hand. One choice is the set  motivated by the cluster size distribution, another choice is  motivated by the structure of the infinite cluster. So-called correction exponents extend these sets, they refer to higher orders of the asymptotic expansion around the critical point.

Definitions of exponents

Self-similarity at the percolation threshold 

Percolation clusters become self-similar precisely at the threshold density  for sufficiently large length scales, entailing the following asymptotic power laws:

Other notation: magnetic exponent  and co-dimension .

The Fisher exponent  characterizes the cluster-size distribution , which is often determined in computer simulations. The latter counts the number of clusters with a given size (volume) , normalized by the total volume (number of lattice sites).

The exponent  is connected with the leading correction to scaling, which appears, e.g., in the asymptotic expansion of the cluster-size distribution,
Also, .

For quantities like the mean cluster size , the corrections are controlled by the exponent .

The minimum or chemical distance or shortest-path exponent  describes how the average minimum distance  relates to the Euclidean distance , namely  Note, it is more appropriate  and practical to measure average , <> for a given . The elastic backbone  has the same fractal dimension as the shortest path. One also writes .

Also related to the minimum dimension is the simultaneous growth of two nearby clusters.

The dimension of the backbone, which is defined as the subset of cluster sites

Critical behavior close to the percolation threshold 

The approach to the percolation threshold is governed by power laws again, which hold asymptotically close to :

The exponent  describes the divergence of the correlation length  as the percolation transition is approached, . The infinite cluster becomes homogeneous at length scales beyond the correlation length; further, it is a measure for the linear extent of the largest finite cluster. Other notation: Thermal exponent  and dimension .

Off criticality, only finite clusters exist up to a largest cluster size , and the cluster-size distribution is smoothly cut off by a rapidly decaying function, . The exponent  characterizes the divergence of the cutoff parameter, . From the fractal relation we have , yielding .

The density of clusters (number of clusters per site)  is continuous at the threshold but its third derivative goes to infinity as determined by the exponent : , where  represents the coefficient above and below the transition point.

Just above the transition, defining the exponent .  plays the role of an order parameter.

The divergence of the mean cluster size  introduces the exponent .

The conductivity exponent  describes how the electrical conductivity  goes to zero in a conductor-insulator mixture, . Also, .

Surface critical exponents 

Scaling relations

Hyperscaling relations

Relations based on

Relations based on

Conductivity scaling relations

Surface scaling relations

Exponents for standard percolation

Exponents for protected percolation 

In protected percolation, bonds are removed one at a time only from the percolating cluster. Isolated clusters are no longer modified.

Exponents for standard percolation on a non-trivial planar lattice (Weighted planar stochastic lattice (WPSL)) 

Note that it has been claimed that the numerical values of exponents of percolation depend only on the dimension of lattice. However, percolation on WPSL is an exception in the sense that albeit it is two dimensional yet it does not belong to the same universality where all the planar lattices belong.

Exponents for directed percolation 

Directed percolation (DP) refers to percolation in which the fluid can flow only in one direction along bonds—such as only in the downward direction on a square lattice rotated by 45 degrees. This system is referred to as "1 + 1 dimensional DP" where the two dimensions are thought of as space and time.

Also . It satisfies the hyperscaling relation .

Another convention has been used for the exponent , which here we call , is defined through the relation , so that .    It satisfies the hyperscaling relation .

 is the exponent corresponding to the behavior of the survival probability as a function of time: .

 (sometimes called ) is the exponent corresponding to the behavior of the average number of visited sites at time  (averaged over all samples including ones that have stopped spreading): .

The d(space)+1(time) dimensional exponents are given below.

Scaling relations for directed percolation

Exponents for dynamic percolation 

For dynamic percolation (epidemic growth of ordinary percolation clusters), we have

,  implying 

 

For , consider , and taking the derivative with respect to   yields  , implying

 

Also, 

Using exponents above, we find

See also 

 Critical exponent
 Percolation theory
 Percolation threshold
 Percolation surface critical behavior
 Conductivity near the percolation threshold

Notes

References

Further reading 

Percolation theory
Critical phenomena
Random graphs
Critical exponents (phase transitions)